Events from the year 1580 in the Kingdom of Scotland.

Incumbents
Monarch – James VI

Births
 12 January – Alexander Ruthven, master of Ruthven (killed 1600)
 14 September – Robert Gordon of Straloch, cartographer, poet, musician, mathematician and antiquary (died 1661)
Prince William Caudle
 Alexander Leslie, 1st Earl of Leven, soldier (died 1661)
 Approximate date – George Sinclair, mercenary (killed at Battle of Kringen 1612)

Deaths
 6 January – James Hamilton, bishop of Argyll
  – William MacDowall, priest and Master of Works
 27 October – Adam Gordon of Auchindoun, knight (born 1545)
Robert Lindsay of Pitscottie, chronicler (born )

See also
 Timeline of Scottish history

References